Alpine Skiing at the 1976 Winter Olympics consisted of six alpine skiing events. Similar to the 1964 games, the men's downhill was held on Patscherkofel (above Igls), the other five events at Axamer Lizum. The events began on 5 February and ended on 13 February 1976.

Medal summary
Nine nations won medals in Alpine skiing, with West Germany led the medal table with two gold and a silver, all won by Rosi Mittermaier. Italy won the most total medals, with four. The two medals won by Liechtenstein were the first for the country at the Olympic Games. The four medals won by West Germany were the first in the sport for the country on its own; Germany had previously won medals when unified as a single team.

Olympic medal table

Source:

Men's events

Source:

Women's events

Source:

Course information

Source:

Participating nations
Thirty-three nations sent alpine skiers to compete in the events in Innsbruck. Andorra and San Marino made their Olympic alpine skiing debuts. Below is a list of the competing nations; in parentheses are the number of national competitors.

World championships
From 1948 through 1980, the alpine skiing events at the Winter Olympics also served as the World Championships, held every two years.  With the addition of the giant slalom, the combined event was dropped for 1950 and 1952, but returned as a World Championship event in 1954 as a "paper race" which used the results from the three events. During the Olympics from 1956 through 1980, World Championship medals were awarded by the FIS for the combined event. The combined returned as a separate event at the World Championships in 1982 and at the Olympics in 1988.

World championships medal table

Inckuded combined events

Combined

Men's Combined

Downhill: 5 February, Giant Slalom: 9–10 February, Slalom: 14 February

Women's Combined

Downhill: 8 February, Giant Slalom: 13 February, Slalom: 11 February

See also
Alpine skiing at the 1976 Winter Paralympics

References

External links
FIS-Ski.com – results – 1976 Olympics – Innsbruck, Austria
FIS-Ski.com – results – 1976 World Championships – Innsbruck, Austria

 
1976 Winter Olympics events
Alpine skiing at the Winter Olympics
Winter Olympics
Alpine skiing competitions in Austria